The 51st Arizona State Legislature, consisting of the Arizona State Senate and the Arizona House of Representatives, was constituted in Phoenix from January 1, 2013, to December 31, 2014, during the last two years of Jan Brewer's first full term in office. Both the Senate and the House membership remained constant at 30 and 60, respectively. The Democrats gained five seats in the Senate, decreasing the Republican majority to 16–14. The Democrats also gained four seats in the lower chamber, leaving the Republicans with a 36–24 majority.

Sessions
The Legislature met for two regular sessions at the State Capitol in Phoenix. The first opened on January 14, 2013, and adjourned on June 14, while the Second Regular Session convened on January 13, 2014, and adjourned sine die on April 24.

There were two Special Sessions, the first of which was convened on June 11, 2013, and adjourned on June 14; while the second convened on May 27, 2014, and adjourned sine die on May 29.

State Senate

Members

The asterisk (*) denotes members of the previous Legislature who continued in office as members of this Legislature.

House of Representatives

Members 
The asterisk (*) denotes members of the previous Legislature who continued in office as members of this Legislature.

References

Arizona legislative sessions
2013 in Arizona
2014 in Arizona
2013 U.S. legislative sessions
2014 U.S. legislative sessions